Copper chromite is an inorganic compound with the formula Cu2Cr2O5. It is a black solid that is used to catalyze reactions in organic synthesis.

History
The material was first described in 1908. The catalyst was developed in North America by Homer Burton Adkins and Wilbur Arthur Lazier, partly based on interrogation of German chemists after World War II in relation to the Fischer–Tropsch process. For this reason it is sometimes referred to as the Adkins catalyst or the Lazier catalyst.

Chemical structure
The compound adopts a spinel structure. The oxidation states for the constituent metals are Cu(II) and Cr(III).  A variety of compositions are recognized for the substance, including Cu2CrO4·CuO·BaCrO4 (CAS# 99328-50-4) and Cu2Cr2O5 (CAS# 12053-18-8). Commercial samples often contain barium oxide and other components.

Production
Copper chromite is produced by thermal decomposition of one of three substances. The traditional method is by the ignition of copper chromate:
 2  → 2  + 
Copper barium ammonium chromate is the most commonly used substance for production of copper chromite. The resulting copper chromite mixture produced by this method can only be used in procedures that contain materials inert to barium, as barium is a product of the decomposition of copper barium ammonium chromate, and is thus present in the resulting mixture. The by-product copper oxide is removed using an acetic acid extraction, consisting of washing with the acid, decantation and then heat drying of the remaining solid to yield isolated copper chromite. Copper chromite is produced by the exposure of copper barium ammonium chromate to temperatures of 350-450 °C, generally by a muffle furnace:
  →  + CuO + 2 Ba + 4  + 4 Cr +  + 6  
Copper ammonium chromate is also used for production of copper chromite. It is generally utilized as an alternative to the route of barium ammonium chromate for usage in chemicals reactive with barium. This can also be washed with acetic acid and dried to remove impurities. Copper chromite is produced through the exposure of copper ammonium chromate to temperatures of 350-450 °C:
  →  + CrO + 4  + 

An active copper chromite catalyst which includes barium in its structure can be prepared from a solution containing barium nitrate, copper(II) nitrate, and ammonium chromate. When these compounds are mixed a resulting precipitate is formed. This solid product is then calcined at 350–400 °C to yield the catalyst:

 Cu(NO3)2 + Ba(NO3)2 + (NH4)2CrO4 → CuCr2O4·BaCr2O4

Illustrative reactions
Hydrogenolysis of ester compounds to the corresponding alcohols, and carbon–carbon and carbon–oxygen double bonds to single bonds. For example, sebacoin, derived from the acyloin condensation of dimethyl sebacate, is hydrogenated to 1,2-cyclodecanediol by this catalyst. Phenanthrene is also reduced, at the 9,10 position.
Hydrogenolysis of tetrahydrofurfuryl alcohol to 1,5-pentanediol at 250–300 °C under 3300-6000 psi of H2.
Decarboxylation of α-phenylcinnamic acid to cis-stilbene.

Reactions involving hydrogen are conducted at relatively high gas pressure (135 atm) and high temperatures (150–300 °C) in a so-called hydrogenation bomb. More active catalysts, such as W-6 grade Raney nickel, also catalyze hydrogenations such as ester reductions. The latter catalyst benefits from requiring less vigorous conditions (i.e., it works at room temperature under similar hydrogenation pressures) but requires the chemist to use a higher ratio of catalyst to reagents.

See also
Amide reduction

References

External links 
 CAS registry [7440-47-3] & [1317-38-0]

Reagents for organic chemistry
Copper(II) compounds
Hydrogenation catalysts
Chromium(III) compounds
Chromium–oxygen compounds
Substances discovered in the 1900s